This article lists types of American military electronic instruments along with brief descriptions of them.  Electronic items of this sort are assigned designations according to the Joint Electronics Type Designation System, beginning with the AN/ prefix.  They are grouped below by the first designation letter following this prefix.

A

AN/AAA-4: Infrared System for F-4H, ACF, Inc., Avion Division.
AN/AAD-4: Forward Looking Infrared Detection Set (FLIR) manufactured by Texas Instruments; used in AC-119G
AN/AAD-5: Infrared IR Reconnaissance Set Manufactured by Honeywell Aerospace Systems; RF-4C
AN/AAD-7: Forward Looking Infrared Detection Set (FLIR) manufactured by Texas Instruments, Inc.; used in AC-130-A, E, H
AN/AAQ-1: Spectrometer
AN/AAQ-2: Aircraft pod-mounted FLIR system, aka "LITENING"
AN/AAQ-3: Aircraft Targeting System, aka "Sniper XR"
AN/AAQ-4: Infrared Countermeasures System; manufactured by Hallicrafters and by Northrop; used in B-66, EB-66C/E, B-52, RF-4C
AN/AAQ-5: FLIR Night Vision Sight; used in UH-1M, AH-1G
AN/AAQ-6: FLIR Electro-Optical Viewing System; manufactured by Hughes; used in B-52G/H
AN/AAQ-7: Laser Rangefinder System; used in AC-130A/H
AN/AAQ-8: IR Countermeasures Pod (development of AN/AAQ-4); manufactured by Hallicrafters and by Northrop Grumman; used with A-7D, F-4
AN/AAQ-9: FLIR Imaging Module; used in AN/AVQ-26; used in F-111, A-10, F-4, RF-4C
AN/AAQ-10: FLIR; used in HH-53H, MH-53J, MC-130E
AN/AAQ-11: PNVS (Pilot Night Vision Sensor) FLIR; manufactured by Lockheed Martin; used with AN/ASQ-170; used in AH-64
AN/AAQ-12: TADS (Target Acquisition Designation Sight), a turreted sensor pack designed for target acquisition, range-finding and target illumination for the use of laser-guided missiles
AN/AAQ-13: aircraft pod-mounted radar and FLIR system, included in LANTIRN system
AN/AAQ-14: aircraft pod-mounted laser designation and FLIR system, included in LANTIRNsystem 
AN/AAQ-19: Targeting Pod (downgraded AN/AAQ-14) "Sharpshooter"
AN/AAQ-20: Navigation Pod (downgraded AN/AAQ-13) "Pathfinder"
AN/AAQ-22: aircraft SAFIRE FLIR pod, Star
AN/AAQ-24: Directional Infrared Counter Measures
AN/AAQ-26: IR detection set for AC-130H/U
AN/AAQ-28: LITENING targeting pod
AN/AAQ-32: IFTS (Internal FLIR Targeting System) (F-16 Block 60)
AN/AAQ-33: Lockheed Martin Sniper XR targeting pod
AN/AAS-33A: Detection and Ranging System (DRS), manufactured by Hughes Aircraft Co. Electro-Optical & Data Systems Group, to be used with the A-6 TRAM all-weather, day/night weapons delivery system
 AN/AAS-35(V): Target Identification Set, Laser (TISL) "Pave Penny"; manufactured by Martin Marietta; used with A-10A
AN/AAQ-37: Distributed Aperture System (DAS), F-35 Lightning II Missile Approach Warning System
AN/AAQ-39: Electro-optical/infrared fire control system on Air Force Special Operations Command AC-130U Gunship 
AN/AAQ-40: F-35 Lightning II EOTS (Electro-Optical Targeting System) 
AN/AAR-31: airborne radiation thermometer for naval applications
AN/AAR-34: Infrared (IR) Tracking & Missile Warning System (F-111) 
AN/AAR-44: infrared warning receiver, hemispherical search for the heat plumes from missile launches; manufactured by Cincinnati Electronics
AN/AAR-47: aircraft missile-launch detector
AN/AAR-50: aircraft TINS navigation pod
AN/AAR-54: aircraft missile-launch detector (B-2, C-130)
AN/AAR-56: F-22 missile approach warning system
AN/AAR-57: Common Missile Warning System (CMWS)
AN/AAS-38: aircraft pod-mounted FLIR and laser designation system, Nite Hawk
AN/AAU-34: altimeter
AN/ADR-6: Army Aerial Radiac Meter, North American Rockwell
AN/AES-210/E: ESM and ELINT system. Frequence range 0.5–18 GHz. For aircraft, helicopters, naval
AN/AES-210/V: ESM and ELINT system for UAV.
AN/AIC-14A: Intercommunication Set – provides internal and external communications for crew members
AN/AJQ-20A: F-111 INS (inertial navigation set), by Litton Industries
AN/ALE-28: F-111 ECM (electronic countermeasure) dispensing set, General Dynamics
AN/ALE-29: countermeasures chaff dispenser
AN/ALE-38/41: countermeasures chaff dispenser, ALE-38 for USAF version, ALE-41 for USN version
AN/ALE-39: decoy dispensing system
AN/ALE-40: Counter Measure Dispenser System (CMDS) for fixed-wing aircraft
AN/ALE-44: Counter Measures Set, Southwest Aerospace Corp.
AN/ALE-45: Counter Measures Dispensing System (CMD) (F-15)
AN/ALE-47: aircraft chaff/flare countermeasures dispenser
AN/ALE-50: aircraft passive ECM towed decoy
AN/ALE-52: Counter Measure Dispenser System (CMDS) (F-22)
AN/ALE-55: improved AN/ALE-50, ALE-55 Fiber-Optic Towed Decoy
AN/ALE-58: BOL CMDS (Back-Of-Launcher—Counter Measure Dispenser System)
AN/ALQ-13: internal countermeasure set for F-15 aircraft
AN/ALQ-70: aircraft active ECM jamming system
AN/ALQ-73: aircraft active ECM jamming system
AN/ALQ-87: aircraft active ECM system, external pod, General Electric
AN/ALQ-91: communications jammer for F-14 Tomcat, internally-mounted, Sanders/Magnavox
AN/ALQ-94: aircraft combined pulse mode and CW deception and noise jammer (trackbreaker) with three subsystems covering low (E/F), mid (G/H) and high (I/J) bands with fore and, in some airframes, aft coverage mounted on F/EF-111A/E/F, Replaced by ALQ-137, Sanders Associates
AN/ALQ-98: noise jamming system carried by US Navy helicopters and intended to counter Soviet cruise missiles, internally mounted, General Instrument
AN/ALQ-99: Tactical Jamming System (TJS), aircraft active ECM jammer/deceiver for EA-6B. Raytheon ESD (Electromagnetic Systems Division), Goleta, California (T-110B Band 7E Transmitter), AIL/AEL/IBM (Eaton/AIL Division, Deer Park, NY, Band 1 Transmitter), Grumman Aerospace Corporation (low band radomes)
AN/ALQ-100: aircraft active ECM system for Navy F-14 Tomcat, A-4 Skyhawk, A-7 Corsair II and EA-6 Prowler, internally mounted, Sanders Associates
AN/ALQ-101: aircraft active ECM system, Westinghouse
AN/ALQ-108: aircraft active ECM system (E-2C), Magnavox
AN/ALQ-117: aircraft active ECM system (B-52), ITT
AN/ALQ-119: aircraft active ECM system, external pod, Westinghouse
AN/ALQ-122: false-target generator intended to protect the B-52G and B-52H from SA-3 Goa missile system, and from the surveillance radar of Tu-126 Moss, Motorola
AN/ALQ-123: aircraft infrared countermeasures device (IR-jammer), Electro-Optical Systems Division of the Xerox Corporation, used on variety of military and civil aircraft to counter threat posed by MANPADS during descend/ascent flight phase
AN/ALQ-126: aircraft active ECM pulsed trackbreaker, Sanders Associates
AN/ALQ-128: aircraft active ECM receiver used on F-15C/E
AN/ALQ-129: aircraft trackbreaker for Navy F-4 Phantom, F-14 Tomcat, and A-7 Corsair, internally mounted, ITT
AN/ALQ-130: aircraft active ECM system for Navy A-4 Skyhawk, A-6 Intruder, EA-6 Prowler, A-7 Corsair, and F-4 Phantom, intended to disrupt air-defence communications links, Cutler-Hammer AIL Division
AN/ALQ-131: aircraft active ECM system, external pod, Westinghouse
AN/ALQ-132: aircraft electro-optical EW system intended to confuse heat-seeking missiles, Sanders Associates
AN/ALQ-135: aircraft active ECM system, F-15 Internal Countermeasures Set, Northrop
AN/ALQ-136: aircraft radar jammer (helicopters), ITT
AN/ALQ-137: aircraft combined pulse mode and CW deception and noise jammer with three subsystems covering low (E/F), mid (G/H) and high (I/J) bands with fore and, in some airframes, aft coverage mounted on F/EF-111A/E/F, Replaced ALQ-94, Sanders Associates
AN/ALQ-140: aircraft infrared jammer for F-4 Phantom, internally mounted, Sanders Associates
AN/ALQ-142: ESM/SIGINT system for naval helicopters, part of LAMPS III system. Freq. range: 2–25 GHz
AN/ALQ-144: aircraft infrared jammer for UH-1 and AH-1 helicopters, pod-mounted, Sanders Associates
AN/ALQ-146: aircraft infrared jammer for Navy CH-46D helicopters, pod-mounted, Sanders Associates
AN/ALQ-147: aircraft infrared jammer for Army OV-1D and RV-1D, pylon-mounted, Sanders Associates
AN/ALQ-149: aircraft active ECM anti-communications system mounted on EA-6B
AN/ALQ-151(V2): QUICKFIX: EW system for DF, intercepting and jamming in range 2-80 MHz. Supports AM, FM, CW, SSB with band of 8,30,50 kHz. Output power up to 500 W
AN/ALQ-155: low band jammer (B-52), Northrop
AN/ALQ-156: Integrated Defense Avionics, pulse-doppler missile warning system, Sanders Associates
AN/ALQ-157: aircraft infrared jammer
AN/ALQ-161: aircraft active ECM system (B-1 Lancer), Cutler-Hammer AIL Division
AN/ALQ-161A: aircraft active ECM system (B-1B Lancer), Cutler-Hammer AIL Division
AN/ALQ-162: aircraft active ECM CW trackbreaker, Northrop
AN/ALQ-164: aircraft active ECM pod (AV-8B)
AN/ALQ-165: Airborne Self-Protection Jammer (ASPJ), aircraft active ECM system, developed and manufactured by the joint venture of ITT Avionics Division and Westinghouse Electric Corporation Aerospace Division
AN/ALQ-166: Countermeasures Set, helicopter-towed, remotely controlled minesweeping system. EDO Corporation
AN/ALQ-167: tactical contingency pod—aircraft active ECM system
AN/ALQ-171: Conformal Countermeasures System for F-5E/F and F-5G, Northrop
AN/ALQ-172: self-protection system (AC-130U/H, B-52, MC-130)
AN/ALQ-178: integrated radar warning and ECM suite
AN/ALQ-184: aircraft active ECM system, upgraded from AN/ALQ-119, mounted on F-4G, F-16, Raytheon
AN/ALQ-187: aircraft active ECM, part of the ASPIS system for F-16
AN/ALQ-196: integrated defensive electronic countermeasure system (MC-130E)
AN/ALQ-202: autonomous jammer for F-16
AN/ALQ-205: aircraft infrared jammer
AN/ALQ-210: Electronic support measures (ESM) set (MH-60R)
AN/ALQ-211: Suite of Integrated RF Countermeasures (SIRFC)
AN/ALQ-212: Advanced Threat Infrared Countermeasures (ATIRCM)
AN/ALQ-213:
AN/ALQ-214: aircraft active ECM system
AN/ALQ-217: aircraft electronic support measures (ESM) set (E-2C)
AN/ALQ-218 Tactical Jamming Receiver (EA-18G, EA-6B)
AN/ALR-23: F-111 infrared receiver, AVCO
AN/ALR-45: aircraft radiofrequency warning receiver
AN/ALR-46: aircraft radiofrequency warning receiver, Dalmo-Victor
AN/ALR-56: aircraft radiofrequency warning receiver
AN/ALR-62: Radar Homing and Warning (RHAW) System or Countermeasures Receiving Set (CRS) F-111
AN/ALR-64: aircraft radiofrequency warning receiver, Compass Sail
AN/ALR-66: aircraft radiofrequency warning receiver/electronic support measures
AN/ALR-67: aircraft radiofrequency warning receiver
AN/ALR-69: aircraft radiofrequency warning receiver, Compass Sail+Compass Tie
AN/ALR-73: Passive Detection System (PDS); Electronic support measures, direction finding (E-2C)
AN/ALR-91: aircraft radiofrequency warning receiver used on F-5
AN/ALR-93: aircraft radiofrequency warning receiver
AN/ALR-94: aircraft radiofrequency warning receiver used on F-22
AN/ALR-801: ESM/ELINT system for patrol aircraft. Range 0.5–18 GHz (extendable to 40), sensitivity 60 dBm
AN/ALR-2002: Radar Warning Receiver designed for, but not used on F-111, F/A-18, S-70
AN/ALT-13: ECM barrage transmitter for B-52, Hallicrafters
AN/ALT-15: ECM barrage transmitter for B-52, Hallicrafters
AN/ALT-28: ECM barrage transmitter for B-52, updated version of the earlier ALT-13, Hallicrafters
AN/ALT-30A: ECM barrage transmitter for B-52, updated version of the earlier ALT-15, Hallicrafters
AN/ALT-31: ECM barrage transmitter for B-52, Hallicrafters
AN/ALT-32: ECM barrage transmitter for B-52, Hallicrafters
AN/AMH-3: airborne microwave refractometer mounted on E-2C
AN/AMQ-23: meteorological data system, Geotronics
AN/APA-9: navigation equipment
AN/APG-53A: aircraft radar mounted on the A-4C/M/N
AN/APG-63: aircraft radar mounted on F-15A/B/C/D
AN/APG-65: aircraft radar mounted on F/A-18A/A+/B/C/D
AN/APG-66: aircraft radar mounted on F-16
AN/APG-68: aircraft radar mounted on F-16
AN/APG-69: aircraft radar designed for the F-20 and mounted on some F-5s
AN/APG-70: aircraft radar mounted on F-15E
AN/APG-71: aircraft radar mounted on F-14D
AN/APG-73: aircraft radar mounted on F/A-18A+/A++/C/D
AN/APG-76: aircraft radar mounted on F-4E
AN/APG-77: aircraft radar mounted on F-22
AN/APG-78: aircraft radar mounted on AH-64D, for use with AGM-114L Hellfire II missiles
AN/APG-79: aircraft radar mounted on F/A-18E/F
AN/APG-80: aircraft radar mounted on F-16E/F
AN/APG-81: aircraft radar mounted on F-35
AN/APG-82: aircraft radar mounted on F-15E
AN/APN-1: radar altimeter
AN/APN-2: Interrogator/responser
AN/APN-3: navigation
AN/APN-4: Airborne radio navigation system—LORAN
AN/APN-5:
AN/APN-6:
AN/APN-7: transponder beacon
AN/APN-8
AN/APN-9: simplified LORAN
AN/APN-10: Glider interrogator/responser
AN/APN-11:
AN/APN-12: beacon interrogator/responser
AN/APN-19: beacon
AN/APN-59: airborne Search and Weather radar system
AN/APN-69: airborne Radar Beacon (RACON)
AN/APN-70: LORAN radio navigation system (P3A/B)
AN/APN-141: radar altimeter, vacuum tube set (P3A/B, A-6A)
AN/APN-171: radar altimeter
AN/APN-194: radar altimeter for tracking aerial targets, solid state, improved variant of APN-141 (3 to 5 times more reliable), Honeywell, Inc., Avionics Div. (P3C, A-6E)
AN/APN-203: aircraft high range radar altimeter
AN/APN-215: aircraft weather radar
AN/APN-217: doppler navigation sensor compatible with LAMPS Mk III, for employment on the following helicopters: COBRA, JVX, UH-1H, SH60B, MH53E, RH53D, CH46. Teledyne Ryan Electronics
AN/APN-233: doppler navigator sensor for C-2 and OV-10 platforms, Teledyne Ryan Electronics
AN/APN-234: aircraft weather radar with sea search used on United States Navy C-2A aircraft
AN/APN-237:
AN/APQ-13:
AN/APQ-92: search and terrain avoidance radar for the A-6
AN/APQ-99: Texas Instruments forward looking radar for the RF-4
AN/APQ-110: F-111 terrain following radar, Texas Instruments
AN/APQ-112: target tracking and ranging radar for the A-6
AN/APQ-113: multi-mode nose attack radar for the F-111, General Electric
AN/APQ-114: multi-mode nose radar variant of the APQ-113 for the FB-111A
AN/APQ-116: aircraft radar mounted on A-7 and C-130
AN/APQ-120: Westinghouse aircraft fire control radar for the F-4
AN/APQ-122: Texas Instruments airborne search and weather radar system
AN/APQ-126: Texas Instruments airborne navigation and attack radar for the A-7
AN/APQ-140: Raytheon airborne radar for the KC-135
AN/APQ-144: APQ-113 variant for the F-111F
AN/APQ-146: Texas Instruments forward looking multi-mode radar for the F-111F
AN/APQ-148: Nordern Systems multi-mode radar for the A-6
AN/APQ-153: fire control radar for the F-5E
AN/APQ-156: variant of the APQ-148 with FLIR for the A-6E
AN/APQ-157: fire control radar for the F-5F
AN/APQ-158: airborne forward-looking radar for the Pavelow III variant of the HH-53
AN/APQ-159: airborne forward-looking radar for the F-5E
AN/APQ-161: updated APS-144 airborne radar for the F-111F
AN/APQ-163: variant of the APQ-144 for the B-1
AN/APQ-164: aircraft radar mounted on B-1B
AN/APQ-172: aircraft radar terrain-following radar mounted on RF-4C/E
AN/APQ-174: aircraft radar mounted on MH-47 and MH-60
AN/APQ-179: aircraft control indicator set (CIS) mounted on E-2C
AN/APQ-180
AN/APQ-181: aircraft radar mounted on B-2
AN/APR-9: aircraft radiofrequency receiver
AN/APR-25: S/X/C-Band Radar Homing and Warning Set, Itek
AN/APR-27: SAM Radar Warning Receiver, Magnavox
AN/APR-38: aircraft radiofrequency receiver mounted on F-4G
AN/APR-39: aircraft radar warning receiver/electronic warfare management system
AN/APR-43: aircraft radiofrequency receiving CW launch warner, Compass Sail Clockwise
AN/APR-44: lightweight radar warning receiver
AN/APR-47: aircraft radiofrequency receiving ESM system mounted on F-4G
AN/APS-2
AN/APS-13: ARI 5664 UHF RADAR also called Monica, AKA Archie when used on Little Boy Bomb
AN/APS-20: airborne search radar (TBM-3W, WV-2, PB-1W, ZPG-2W, WB-29, EC-121 and P2V)
AN/APS-45: airborne height-finding radar (EC-121) 
AN/APS-80: surface search radar (P3A/B)
AN/APS-94: airborne side-looking radar for the OV-1 Mohawk
AN/APS-109: F-111 radar homing and warning, Dalmo Victor
AN/APS-115: airborne search radar for the P-3C
AN/APS-116: airborne search radar for the S-3A (designed as an Airborne ASW Radar, Project W12-17), Texas Instruments
AN/APS-120: airborne radar for the E-2C
AN/APS-125: upgrade of the APS-120 for the E-2C
AN/APS-137: Radar System, multipurpose radar for target identification at a standoff range, an upgrade of the APS-116 for the S-3B, Texas Instruments
AN/APS-138: upgrade of the APS-125 for the E-2C
AN/APS-145: upgrade of the APS-138 for the E-2C
AN/APW-1: SCR-584-M missile control Receiver and beacon
AN/APX-6 : aircraft IFF system
AN/APX-64: aircraft IFF System
AN/APX-72: aircraft IFF System, Bendix, Honeywell
AN/APX-80: Airborne IFF transponder system
AN/APX-81: Airborne IFF interrogator developed for the F-4 after examining a Soviet SRO-2 transponder
AN/APX-92: Airborne IFF (air-by-ground) Transponder System for Army aircraft, Packard Bell
AN/APX-100: Transponder System
AN/APX-101: Transponder System
AN/APX-108: Transponder System
AN/APX-109: Combined Interrogator & Transponder System
AN/APX-110: Transponder System
AN/APX-113: Combined Interrogator & Transponder System, BAE Systems
AN/APX-114: Transponder System
AN/APX-117: Transponder System
AN/APX-118: Transponder System
AN/APX-119: Transponder System
AN/APX-121: Transponder System
AN/APX-123: Transponder System
AN/APX-124: Transponder System
AN/APX-125: Combined Interrogator & Transponder System, BAE Systems
AN/APX-126: Combined Interrogator & Transponder System, BAE Systems
AN/APY-1: aircraft AWACS surveillance radar on E-3B
AN/APY-2: improved AN/APY-1 on E-3C
AN/APY-3: aircraft surveillance radar on E-8 Joint STARS
AN/APY-X: improved AN/APY-3 on E-8C
AN/AQS-10: airborne dipping sonar (Navy SH-3A helicopter)
AN/AQS-13: airborne dipping sonar (Navy SH-3D helicopter)
AN/AQS-22: aircraft dipping sonar on SH-60R
AN/ARA-1: gives left-right radio compass operation similar to SCR-186
AN/ARA-25: UHF radio compass 
AN/ARA-50: UHF radio compass 
AN/ARA-63: Radio receiving-decoding set, AIL Co., ASC Systems Corp.
AN/ARA-63B: Aircraft Approach Control System (AACS); backup carrier landing system. Used on the E-2C and others.
AN/ARC-1
AN/ARC-2
AN/ARC-3
AN/ARC-4
AN/ARC-5: aircraft radio communication system
AN/ARC-6
AN/ARC-7
AN/ARC-8
AN/ARC-9
AN/ARC-10
AN/ARC-21 aircraft HF transceiver AM/CW replaced by AN/ARC-65
AN/ARC-27: aircraft UHF radio communication system 
AN/ARC-34: aircraft UHF radio communication system
AN/ARC-38 aircraft HF transceiver
AN/ARC-51: aircraft UHF radio communication system
AN/ARC-55: aircraft UHF radio communication system (unpressurized version of AN/ARC-27)
AN/ARC-58: aircraft HF radio communication system
AN/ARC-65: aircraft HF radio communication system replaced AN/ARC-21 added SSB
AN/ARC-73: aircraft VHF radio communication system
AN/ARC-94: aircraft HF radio communication system (P3A/B)
AN/ARC-101:aircraft VHF radio communication system (Rockwell Collins P3A/B)
AN/ARC-105: aircraft HF radio communication system
AN/ARC-133: aircraft UHF Radio communication system (pressurized version of AN/ARC-34)
AN/ARC-158: aircraft UHF radio communication system
AN/ARC-159: aircraft UHF radio communication system
AN/ARC-164: aircraft UHF radio communication system
AN/ARC-182: aircraft VHF/UHF radio communication system, Rockwell-Collins Defense Communications
AN/ARC-186: aircraft VHF AM/FM radio communication system
AN/ARC-190: aircraft HF radio communication system
AN/ARC-210: aircraft VHF/UHF/SATCOM radio communication system
AN/ARC-231: aircraft VHF/UHF/SATCOM radio communication system built by Raytheon
AN/ARC-232: aircraft VHF/UHF radio communication system built by Raytheon
AN/ARC-234: aircraft radio communication system built by Raytheon
AN/ARN-1
AN/ARN-2
AN/ARN-3
AN/ARN-4
AN/ARN-5: glide path receiver used with AN/CRN-2
AN/ARN-6: aircraft radio compass similar to SCR-269
AN/ARN-7: automatic direction finder
AN/ARN-8
AN/ARN-10
AN/ARN-11
AN/ARN-12: aircraft Marer Beacon receiver system
AN/ARN-14: aircraft HVF Omni Range (VOR) system
An/ARN-21: aircraft TACAN system
AN/ARN-52: aircraft TACAN system
AN/ARN-89: aircraft radio direction finder
AN/ARN-109 : aircraft LORAN system
AN/ARN-118: aircraft TACAN radio navigation system
AN/ARN-126: for H-3 and S-3 aircraft, AAR Allen Aircraft
AN/ARN-147: aircraft VOR/ILS navigation system
AN/ARN-151: aircraft GPS navigation system (E-2C, others)
AN/ARQ-34: aircraft HF radio communication system (E-2C, C-2A)
AN/ART-13
AN/ARU-48A: Attitude Indicator for F-14D and all types and series of F/A-18 and A-6 aircraft, Jet Electronics & Technology, Inc.
AN/ARU-50
AN/ARU-56
AN/ARW-1: radio control receiver
AN/ARW-9: remote bomb release
AN/ARW-10: remote bomb release
AN/ARW-18: radio control transmitter
AN/ARW-26: target control receiver
AN/ARW-33: radio control transmitter
AN/ARW-38: radio control transmitter
AN/ASB-19: ARBS
AN/ASD-1
AN/ASG-18: aircraft radar intended to be mounted on XF-108
AN/ASH-33A: Digital Magnetic Tape Set, Honeywell
AN/ASN-64: Doppler Navigation Set, Ryan and Canadian Marconi Co. (competitive procurement)
AN/ASN-123: Digital Display Group for EA-6B aircraft, used to display electronic countermeasures data processed by the AN/ALQ-99 tactical jamming system. Teledyne Systems Company
AN/ASN-139: carrier aircraft INS (E-2C)
AN/ASQ-8: magnetic anomaly detector (P-2, blimps)
AN/ASQ-81: magnetic anomaly detector (LAMPS helicopters, P-3)
AN/ASQ-119: Astrotracker astrocompass manufactured by Litton and used for stellar navigation as part of the avionics suite mounted on FB-111A Aardvark aircraft.
 AN/ASQ-153 \ AN/AVQ-23 Electro-Optical Laser Designator Targeting Pod; manufactured by Westinghouse {Pave Spike}; F-4E
AN/ASQ-213: aircraft HARM Targeting System pod, for use with AGM-88 anti-radar missiles
AN/ASQ-228: aircraft pod-mounted laser designation and FLIR system, ATFLIR
AN/ASQ-236: high resolution SAR
AN/ASQ-239: F-35 Lightning II electronic warfare system
AN/ASW-15: Automatic Flight Control System (AFCS), autopilot system for E-2C
AN/ASW-25: Automatic Carrier Landing System (ACLS), RADAR-controlled two-mode automated carrier landing system
AN/ASW-27: Data Link System, Harris Corporation
AN/ASW-27B: aircraft Two Way Data Link mounted on F-14
AN/ASW-50: Standard Automatic Flight Control System (SAFCS), autopilot system for E-2C
 AN/ASX-1 Target Identification System Electro-Optical (TISEO); manufactured by Northrop; F-4E, F-14
AN/AVQ-10
AN/AVQ-11
AN/AVQ-23
AN/AVQ-26
AN/AVQ-75: aircraft DME system
AN/AVR-2: aircraft laser detector
 AN/AVQ-18 Laser Designator; manufactured by Korad; AC-130A
 AN/AVQ-19 Laser Target Range Designator (LTDR); manufactured by Hughes Aircraft, Inc.; AC-130E, H
AN/AVS-6 and AN/AVS-9: Army and Air Force/Navy variants of a dual tube night vision device used by aviators
AN/AVS-10: PNVG (Panoramic Night Vision Goggles), also called ANVIS 10, used mainly by aviators; precursor to the GPNVG-18
AN/AVU-8
AN/AWG-9: radar and fire control system for the F-14 
AN/AWG-10: missile control system for the F-4J Phantom
AN/AWG-10A: improved variant of the AWG-10
AN/AWG-11: Ferranti missile control system for the Royal Air Force F-4K
AN/AWG-11A: improved variant as AWG-10A
AN/AWG-12: Ferranti missile control system for the Royal Navy F-4M
AN/AWG-12A: improved variant as AWG-10A
AN/AWG-21: AGM-78 Standard ARM Avionics for A-6 naval aircraft
AN/AXR-1: radio receiver (television)
AN/AXT-2: radio transmitter (television)
AN/AYK-10A: general purpose digital computer, aircraft computer for S-3, first it used mated film memory stacks, then CMOS memory units, manufactured by Sechan Electronics (computer) and UNISYS Corp., Winnipeg, Manitoba, Canada (mated film memory stacks and COMOS memory units)
AN/AYK-14: Standard Airborne Computer, aircraft mission computer mounted on SH-60R, UNISYS and Control Data Corporation (both from Minneapolis, MN)
AN/AYR-1: aircraft ESM radar on late-modal E-3

B

 AN/BPS-15: surface search radar, for submarines
 AN/BPS-16: surface search radar, for submarines
 AN/BQQ-5: SONAR Data Gathering Set
 AN/BQR-15: Signal Processing and Display (SPAD) towed array, Western Electric Co. (WECO) design, development and fabrication of engineering development models (contract issued May 25, 1972), with Raytheon Co. subcontractor for the development effort
 AN/BSY-1: submarine advanced combat system, known as SUBACS, developed by IBM Corporation in Manassas, Virginia
 AN/BSY-2: submarine advanced combat system for the s

C

AN/CMS-2: language compiling system for high-level language application (i.e., JOVIAL, COBOL, FORTRAN) for use with the AN/UYK-7 Command Data System
AN/CPN-1: radar beacons
AN/CPN-2
AN/CPN-3: homing beacon
AN/CPN-4
AN/CPN-5
AN/CPN-6: homing beacon (BGX)
AN/CPN-7 BABS
AN/CPN-8: homing beacon (BPS)
AN/CPN-9
AN/CPN-10
AN/CPN-11]: transportable LORAN ground station
AN/CPN-12: double master LORAN ground station
AN/CPS-9
AN/CRC-7
AN/CRN-1: buoy radio beacon
AN/CRN-2: trailer mounted, glide path transmitter
AN/CRN-3: azimuth transmitter, same as AN/MRN-1
AN/CRN-4
AN/CRN-5: portable UHF radio range. replaced SCR-277
AN/CRN-6
AN/CRN-7
AN/CRN-8
AN/CRN-9
AN/CRN-10
AN/CRT-1: first military sonobuoy (obsolete)
AN/CRT-4: second military sonobuoy (obsolete)
AN/CRW-2: radio control receiver
AN/CRW-7: radio control receiver
AN/CYZ-9: random data generator
AN/CYZ-10: key fill device

D
AN/DAW-1: MIM-72 Chaparral improved All-Aspect Guidance Section, designed by Steve Golden

F

AN/FGC-59: teletype, Teletype Corp.
AN/FLR-9
AN/FMQ-19: automated meteorological observing system (AMOS)
AN/FPQ-4: DAMP project
AN/FPQ-6
AN/FPS-1
AN/FPS-2
AN/FPS-3: search radar
AN/FPS-4
AN/FPS-5
AN/FPS-6: height finder
AN/FPS-7
AN/FPS-8
AN/FPS-9
AN/FPS-10
AN/FPS-11
AN/FPS-12: DAMP project
AN/FPS-13
AN/FPS-14
AN/FPS-15
AN/FPS-16: instrumentation (tracking) radar
AN/FPS-17: detection radar
AN/FPS-18
AN/FPS-19
AN/FPS-20
AN/FPS-21
AN/FPS-22
AN/FPS-23: Fluttar radar
AN/FPS-24: long range search radar
AN/FPS-25
AN/FPS-26
AN/FPS-27
AN/FPS-28
AN/FPS-29
AN/FPS-30
AN/FPS-31
AN/FPS-32
AN/FPS-33
AN/FPS-34
AN/FPS-35: long range search radar
AN/FPS-36
AN/FPS-37
AN/FPS-38
AN/FPS-39
AN/FPS-40
AN/FPS-41
AN/FPS-77: Doppler weather radar
AN/FPS-85: Spacetrack radar
AN/FPS-90: height finder
AN/FPS-95: ground air search radar, Cobra Mist
AN/FPS-107
AN/FPS-108
AN/FPS-115
AN/FPS-117: ground air search radar
AN/FPS-118: Over-The-Horizon-Backscatter (OTH-B) radar, developed by General Electric, Syracuse, New York; Raytheon Company, Massachusetts; and Sylvania West, Mountain View, California, Air Force management provided by the Rome Air Development Center, Griffiss Air Force Base, New York
AN/FPS-120
AN/FPS-123
AN/FPS-124: ground air search radar
AN/FPS-126: ground space tracking radar, PAVE PAWS
AN/FPS-129: ground space tracking radar, HAVE STARE
AN/FRD-10: HF Direction Finder, Wullenweber, manufactured by Sylvania Electric Products and RCA (developed by RCA, Kenton Electric and Sylvania)
AN/FRT-24: HF Radio transmitter, built for the U.S. Navy
AN/FRT-39: 5 kW HF multi-mode transmitter
AN/FRT-40: 40 kW HF multi-mode transmitter – an FRT-39 with an additional PA stage
AN/FTR-72: 100 kW VLF transmitter
AN/FSG-1: Nike missile CCCS at Missile Master installations
AN/FSM-1: depot crystal test equipment
AN/FSM-2: depot crystal test equipment
AN/FSM-3: crystal test set TS-139 (TM 11-2606)
AN/FSM-4: crystal parts set
AN/FSM-5: O-76/U Quartz clock (1953)    
AN/FSQ-1
AN/FSQ-2
AN/FSQ-3
AN/FSQ-4
AN/FSQ-5
AN/FSQ-6
AN/FSQ-7: IBM air defense command and control computer; Combat Direction Central
AN/FSQ-8: IBM air defense command and control computer; Combat Control Central
AN/FSQ-9
AN/FSQ-10
AN/FSQ-23: Shore Tactical Assured Command and Control (STACC) (Formerly VSE)
AN/FSQ-27: RW-400 real-time data processing computer by TRW
AN/FTA-15: terminal, Lenkurt Electric

G
AN/GPG-1: Skysweeper antiaircraft weapon, Sperry Corporation, 1950s
AN/GPN-1
AN/GPN-2
AN/GPN-3
AN/GPN-4
AN/GPN-5
AN/GPN-6
AN/GPN-7
AN/GPN-8
AN/GPN-9
AN/GPN-10: Airport Surveillance Radar
AN/GPN-12: Airport Surveillance Radar (ASR-7)
AN/GPN-20: Airport Surveillance Radar USAF (Modified ASR-8)
AN/GPN-27: Airport Surveillance Radar USMC/USN (ASR-8)
AN/GPN-30: Airport Surveillance Radar (ASR-11)
AN/GRC-1
AN/GRC-2
AN/GRC-3
AN/GRC-4
AN/GRC-5
AN/GRC-6
AN/GRC-7
AN/GRC-8
AN/GRC-9 SCR-694
AN/GRC-10
AN/GRC-11
AN/GRC-12
AN/GRC-13
AN/GRC-14
AN/GRC-15
AN/GRC-16
AN/GRC-17
AN/GRC-18
AN/GRC-19 
AN/GRC-20
AN/GRC-21
AN/GRC-22
AN/GRC-23
AN/GRC-24
AN/GRC-25
AN/GRC-26: Radioteletype rig
AN/GRC-27
AN/GRC-28
AN/GRC-29 
AN/GRC-30
AN/GRC-46: Radioteletype
AN/GRC-103: lightweight, general purpose radio relay, manufactured by Canadian Commercial Corp./Canadian Marconi Co., and Magnavox
AN/GRC-109: HF Radio Transmitter/Receiver/Powersupply used by Special Forces during Vietnam era
AN/GRD-6 direction finder, manufactured by Sylvania Electric Products (developed by RCA, Kenton Electric and Sylvania)
AN/GRN-1: ground radio beacon (BC-901 transmitter)
AN/GRR-5
AN/GSG-1
AN/GSG-2
AN/GSG-3
AN/GSG-4
AN/GSG-5 & AN/GSG-6: "BIRDIE" Nike missile CCCS
AN/GSG-7
AN/GSG-8
AN/GSG-9
AN/GSG-10 TACFIRE
AN/GSQ-1
AN/GSQ-16: Automatic Language Translator
 AN/GSQ-33: Burroughs SM-65 Atlas ICBM Guidance Computer MOD1
 AN/GSQ-272: Distributed Common Ground System
AN/GSS-1: medium-range transportable radar set used as a search radar for the Nike Air Defence Missile system
AN/GVS-3: Laser Rangefinder, ruby laser cavity, used by artillery forward observers and 4,2-inch mortar forward observers with infantry and armor units, Martin Marietta, Ocala, FL
AN/GYK-29: battery computer system
AN/GYQ-7: data processing system
GPNVG-18: quad-tubed panoramic night vision goggles

M
AN/MLQ-10: Generator Set, 30 kW, 50/60 Hz
AN/MLQ-12: Generator Set, 60 kW, 50/60 Hz
AN/MLQ-15: Generator Set, 15 kW, 400 Hz
AN/MLQ-16: Generator Set, 5 kW, 60 Hz
AN/MLQ-18: Generator Set, 10 kW, 400 Hz
AN/MLQ-24: ground radio frequency receiver
AN/MLQ-35: Generator Set, 5 kW, 60 Hz
AN/MLQ-36: Generator Set, 5 kW, 60 Hz
AN/MLQ-37: Generator Set, 10 kW, 60 Hz
AN/MLQ-38: Generator Set, 10 kW, 400 Hz
AN/MLQ-39: Generator Set, 15 kW, 400 Hz
AN/MLQ-40: Generator Set, 30 kW, 50/60 Hz
AN/MLQ-41: Generator Set, 60 kW, 50/60 Hz
AN/MLQ-42: Generator Set, 3 kW, 60 Hz
AN/MLQ-43: Generator Set, 3 kW, 60 Hz
AN/MPG-1: radar
AN/MPN-1: ground control radar
AN/MPN-2: ground control radar
AN/MPN-3: ground control radar
AN/MPN-5: ground control radar
AN/MPN-11: ground control radar
AN/MPN-14: ground control radar
AN/MPN-26: ground control radar
AN/MPN-T1: shore-based variant of AN/SPN-10 automatic landing system, Bell Aircraft Corp. under BuShips contract
AN/MPQ-1
AN/MPQ-2
AN/MPQ-3
AN/MPQ-4 Counter-mortar (Firefinder) Radar
AN/MPQ-5
AN/MPQ-6
AN/MPQ-7
AN/MPQ-8
AN/MPQ-9
AN/MPQ-10
AN/MPQ-11
AN/MPQ-12 Corporal II
AN/MPQ-13
AN/MPQ-14
AN/MPQ-15
AN/MPQ-20
AN/MPQ-33
AN/MPQ-34
AN/MPQ-35: high/medium-altitude threat detection radar for MIM-23 Hawk surface-to-air missile system
AN/MPQ-37
AN/MPQ-39
AN/MPQ-46
AN/MPQ-48
AN/MPQ-50
AN/MPQ-51
AN/MPQ-53
AN/MPQ-55
AN/MPQ-57
AN/MPQ-61
AN/MPQ-62
AN/MPQ-64
AN/MPQ-65
AN/MPS-1
AN/MPS-2
AN/MPS-3
AN/MPS-4
AN/MPS-5
AN/MPS-14: height finder
AN/MPS-36: mobile radar used to track missiles in flight at the WSMR
AN/MPX-1
AN/MPX-2
AN/MPX-3
AN/MPX-4
AN/MPX-5
AN/MPX-6
AN/MPX-7
AN/MRC-1
AN/MRC-2
AN/MRC-3
AN/MRC-4
AN/MRC-5
AN/MRC-6
AN/MRC-7
AN/MRC-8
AN/MRC-9
AN/MRC-10
AN/MRN-1: localizer mounted in K-53 truck replaced SCR-241, used with RC-103
AN/MRN-2 Radio Range mounted in K-53 truck used with SCR-522
AN/MRN-3: jeep mounted, marker beacon
AN/MRN-4
AN/MRN-5
AN/MRN-6
AN/MRN-7
AN/MRN-8
AN/MRN-9
AN/MRN-10
AN/MRN-11
AN/MRN-12: mobile control tower
AN/MRN-20: mobile control tower (trailer mounted)
AN/MRQ-7: doppler radio Corporal II
AN/MRR-5 radio receiver
AN/MSA-6 computer Corporal II
AN/MSG-4: Army mobile air defense system, Sperry Corporation, 1950s
AN/MSG-5: air defense system, Sperry Corporation, 1950s
AN/MSQ-1: Close Support Control Set, Reeves Instrument Corporation
AN/MSQ-1A: remote air defense system, Sperry Corporation, 1950s
AN/MSQ-13: interim air defense system, Sperry Corporation, 1950s
AN/MSQ-35: radar bomb scoring central employed by RBS "Express"
AN/MSQ-39
AN/MSQ-77: mobile ground radar control unit deployed on Combat SkySpot
AN/MSQ-46: descendant of AN/MSQ-39
AN/MSQ-104

P
AN/PAQ-1: LTD (Laser Target Designator)
AN/PAQ-3: MULE (Modular Universal Laser Equipment)
AN/PAQ-4: Insight IAL (Infrared Aiming Laser)
AN/PAS-4: Night Vision Weapon Sight. (Weaponsight, Infrared). NSN 1090-00-790-6197; VARO Model 9903 and POLAN Model P-155. Primarily used on the M14 rifle during Vietnam
AN/PAS-5: Driving Binoculars (variant SU-49/PAS-5)  face mounted infrared (IR) binocular used with auxiliary infrared radiation source, enabling the user to operate a vehicle during night hours
AN/PAS-6: Metascope, SU-43/U, Infrared. NSN 5855-790-6197; VARO Model 9902E
AN/PAS-7: Handheld Thermal Viewer by NVL (Night Vision Laboratories). NSN 5855-00-179-3169;  PAS-7A (NSN 5855-01-093-3080)
AN/PAS-8: Aiming Light
AN/PAS-10: Infrared Camera by Magnavox.
AN/PAS-13: TWS (Thermal Weapon Sight)
AN/PAS-17: Thermal Weapon Sight
AN/PAS-18: Stinger Night Sight
AN/PAS-19: Thermal Imager
AN/PAS-20: Hughes HHTI (Hand Held Thermal Imager)
AN/PAS-21: FLIR Thermal Sight (FLIR SeeSpot III), for use with target laser designator or standalone.
AN/PAS-22: Elbit LRTI (Long Range Thermal Imager), used in conjunction with target designator
AN/PAS-23: L3Harris MTM (Mini Thermal Monocular) w/ IR laser
AN/PAS-24: FLIR ObservIR Recon III Thermal Imager w/ laser rangefinder
AN/PAS-25: Elbit TLSI (Thermal Laser Spot Imager) w/ "see-spot" capability for aiding with target designation
AN/PAS-26: FLIR Recon III Lite Thermal Imager w/ laser rangefinder
AN/PAS-27: Insight IWNS-T (Individual Weapon Night Sight-Thermal) 
AN/PAS-28: Raytheon MRTB (Medium Range Thermal Bi-Ocular), based on Elcan's PhantomIRxr
AN/PAS-29: Optics 1 COTI/E-COTI ((Enhanced) Clip-On Thermal Imager), adds thermal imaging and can be combined with night vision goggles
AN/PAS-30: L3 MTI (Mini Thermal Imager), a monocular handheld unit
AN/PAS-31: KAC INOD-LRT Clip-on Night Vision Sniper Scope (Integrated Night Observation Device—Long Range Thermal)
AN/PAS-32: Universal Thermal Binocular?
AN/PAS-33: FLIR Recon V Ultra Lightweight Thermal Binocular w/ laser rangefinder
AN/PAS-34: Optics 1 COSI/E-COSI ((Enhanced) Clip on SWIR Imager), adds short-wave infrared thermal imaging and can be combined with night vision goggles
AN/PAS-35: Leonardo DRS FWS-I (Family of Weapon Sights-Individual) thermal weapon sight, pairs with ENVG and ENVG-B
AN/PAS-36: BAE Systems FWS-I (Family of Weapon Sights-Individual) thermal weapon sight, to be paired with ENVG and ENVG-B
AN/PDR-56: Navy Radiac Meter
AN/PDR-71: Navy Radiac Meter
AN/PED-1: Northrop Grumman LLDR (Lightweight Laser Designator Rangefinder), tripod-mounted laser designator
AN/PED-5: BAE TRIGR LTLM (Target Reconnaissance Infrared Geolocating Range Finder—Laser Target Locator Module), a tripod-mounted laser designator
AN/PED-6: Leonardo DRS JETS TLDS (Joint Effects Targeting System—Target Location Designation System), a tripod-mounted laser designator
AN/PED-7: Optics 1 LTLM II (Laser Target Locator Module), handheld/tripod-mounted laser designator
AN/PEM-1: L3 LBS (Laser Borelight System), used for zeroing small arms
AN/PEQ-1: SOFLAM (Special Operations Forces Laser Acquisition Marker), a tripod-mounted laser designator by Northrop Grumman
AN/PEQ-2: Insight ITPIAL (Infrared Target Pointer/Illuminator/Aiming Laser), weapon-mounted IR laser sight
AN/PEQ-3: Combined laser, IR pointer, and illuminator, for use with H-60 type helicopter's 7.62mm machine guns
AN/PEQ-4: Insight MPLI (Medium Power Laser Illuminator), a handheld target laser designator
AN/PEQ-5: Insight CVL (Carbine Visible Laser)
AN/PEQ-6: Insight ILLM (Integrated Laser Light Module) for MK 23 pistol
AN/PEQ-7: Wilcox MAD (Multi-Aiming Device), weapon-mounted laser sight
AN/PEQ-9: Northrop Grumman LDM (Laser Designator Module)
AN/PEQ-10: L3 LAM 1000 (Laser Aiming Module), for use with pistols
AN/PEQ-11A: BE Meyers DIAL-100G (Dual Infrared Aiming Laser) Crew-Served Multi-Function Aiming Laser, often mounted to crew-served weapons in NAVSPECWAR boats
AN/PEQ-13: Elbit CLRF (Common Laser Range Finder System), a binocular rangefinder
AN/PEQ-14: Insight ILWLP (Integrated Laser White Light Pointer), for mounting on pistols
AN/PEQ-15: Insight/L3Harris ATPIAL (Advanced Target Pointer/Illuminator/Aiming Light), a weapon-mounted IR laser sight
LA-5/PEQ: several variants of the ATPIAL
AN/PEQ-15A: Steiner DBAL-A2 (Dual Beam Aiming Laser), a weapon-mounted IR laser sight
AN/PEQ-16: Insight/L3Harris IPIM/MIPIM ((Mini) Integrated Pointing Illumination Module), a weapon-mounted IR laser sight and visible flashlight
AN/PEQ-17: Elbit PLDR II (Portable Lightweight Designator/Rangefinder), a tripod mounted laser designator
AN/PEQ-18: BE Meyers IZLID 1000P (Infrared Zoom Laser Illuminator Designator), weapon-mountable IR laser target designator and illuminator
AN/PEQ-19: Elbit JTAC LTD (Joint Terminal Attack Controller Laser Target Designator), a tripod mounted laser designator
LA-4/PEQ: BE Meyers GRI2P, visible green laser, IR pointer, IR illuminator 
LA-5/PEQ:  See AN/PEQ-15
LA-7/PEQ: FN SCAR EGLM Pointer (Enhanced Grenade Launcher Module), for aiming grenade launcher
LA-8/P: ALP (Aircrew Laser Pointer) by NVS (Night Vision Systems LLC), a laser pointer mounted on aircrew personnel's finger
LA-9/P: B.E. Meyers GLARE OIS (Green Laser Active Response Equipment—Ocular Interruption System), a non-lethal laser dazzler
LA-10u/PEQ: L3 HLM (Handheld Laser Marker), for target designation
LA-11/PEQ: L3 CSHWAL (Crew Served Heavy Weapon Aiming Laser), a hardened weapon-mounted aiming laser
LA-12/P: L3 weapon-mounted non-lethal laser dazzler, component of GLIS (Green Laser Interdiction System)
LA-13/P: BE Meyers GLARE MOUT Plus (Green Laser Active Response Equipment; Military Operations in Urban Terrain), a non-lethal laser dazzler that is a component of GLIS (Green Laser Interdiction System)
LA-16u/PEQ: L3 HLM II (Handheld Laser Marker), for target designation
LA-17/PEQ: Optics 1 D-PILS (Dual-band Pointer and Illumination Laser System), a weapon-mounted laser sight in the SWIR (short-wave infrared) spectrum
LA-22/U: BE Meyers GLARE RECOIL (Green Laser Active Response Equipment; Regulated Emission Collimated Ocular Interruption Laser), a non-lethal laser dazzler
LA-23/PEQ:  L3Harris NGAL (Next Generation Aiming Laser), a weapon mounted laser sight, designated as MAS-L SAL (Miniature Aiming System-Laser;  Squad Aiming Laser)
LA-24/PEQ: L3Harris PAL (Precision Aiming Laser), weapon-mounted laser sight with rangefinder and ballistic calculator for sniper weapons, designated as MAS-L PAL (Miniature Aiming System-Laser;  Precision Aiming Laser)
AN/PPN-1: Radar Beacon
AN/PPN-2
AN/PPN-3
AN/PPN-4
AN/PPN-5
AN/PPN-6
AN/PPN-7
AN/PPQ-1: Operational radar, personnel detection; a man portable radar set to be used during night patrols to detect enemy personnel
AN/PPS-4: Portable Ground Surveillance Radar, also known as "Silent Sentry", Sperry Gyroscope, Surface Armament Division
AN/PPS-5A: Ground Surveillance Radar
AN/PPS-9: Ground Surveillance Radar with Battlefield Identification Friend-or-Foe Capability, RCA
AN/PPS-10: Ground Surveillance Radar with Battlefield Identification Friend-or-Foe Capability, General Dynamics (also known as GD Model 205)
AN/PPS-14: Listening Post Surveillance Device, developed by U.S. Army Land Warfare Laboratory, Aberdeen Proving Grounds
AN/PPS-15: Ground Surveillance Radar
AN/PRC-1
AN/PRC-2
AN/PRC-3
AN/PRC-4
AN/PRC-5
AN/PRC-6
AN/PRC-7
AN/PRC-8
AN/PRC-9
AN/PRC-10
AN/PRC-11
AN/PRC-12
AN/PRC-13
AN/PRC-14
AN/PRC-15
AN/PRC-16
AN/PRC-17
AN/PRC-18
AN/PRC-19
AN/PRC-20
AN/PRC-25: Radio Set for Forward Area, Manpack-Vehicle, FM, 3-5 Mile Range. Electrospace Corp., Garden City, L.I.
AN/PRC-32
AN/PRC-41
AN/PRC-47: Radio Set man transportable HF 100W AM/CW/USB/RTTY, Powered by AC Supply, Battery or Generator, Transported in two boxes to include all accessories need for operation. 
AN/PRC-49
AN/PRC-63
AN/PRC-65: man-portable transceiver, UHF-band, 1,120 channels, 100-156 mc, 6 lbs, Simmonds Precision Products, Inc.
AN/PRC-66: man-portable transceiver, UHF-band, 3,500 channels, 225-400 mc, 7 lbs, Collins Radio of Canada
AN/PRC-70
AN/PRC-74: Army Manpack Radio, Hughes Aircraft, HF
AN/PRC-77: Radio Set for Forward Area, Manpack-Vehicle,  VHF, FM-band, 3-5 Mile Range, a transistorised, lightweight, FM radio operating over a frequency range of 30-76 MC. It has 920 channels vs 350 channels in the substitute items and is used for short range communications. It also provides many and varied command and control channels for combat unit platoon and company level communications. Electrospace Corp., Garden City, L.I.
AN/PRC-90
AN/PRC-103
AN/PRC-104: USMC Manpack Radio, Hughes Aircraft
AN/PRC-112
AN/PRC-113(V): Magnavox VHF/UHF Radio set
AN/PRC-117F: Harris Falcon II MBMMR (Multiband Multimission Manpack Radio)
AN/PRC-117G: Harris Falcon III MNMR (Multiband Networking Manpack Radio)
AN/PRC-119: SINCGARS (Single Channel Ground and Airborne Radio System)
AN/PRC-125
AN/PRC-127: portable handheld radio Bendix King 2W VHF LPI series
AN/PRC-127A: portable handheld radio Bendix King 2W VHF EPI series
AN/PRC-140
AN/PRC-148: Thales MBITR (Multiband Inter/Intra Team Radio) handheld radio; and JEM (JTRS Enhanced MBITR), an upgraded variant that works with the Joint Tactical Radio System
AN/PRC-149
AN/PRC-150(C): Harris Falcon II Manpack Radio
AN/PRC-152: Harris Falcon III Portable handheld radio, JTRS
AN/PRC-154: Thales Rifleman Radio
AN/PRC-155: GD Manpack Radio
AN/PRC-158: L3Harris Falcon® IV MCMP (Multi-channel Manpack)
AN/PRC-159(V): L3Harris Falcon III Wideband Team Radio
AN/PRC-160(V): L3Harris FALCON III Wideband HF/VHF Tactical Radio System, manpack
AN/PRC-161: Viasat BATS-D (Battlefield Awareness and Targeting System - Dismounted)
AN/PRC-162(V): Collins Aerospace Two-Channel Dismounted Ground Networking Radio, with RT-2048(C)/U
AN/PRC-163: L3Harris Multi-channel Handheld Radio
AN/PRC-165: L3Harris HH-VDL (Handheld Video Data Link)
AN/PRC-166(V): Trellisware Technologies TW-875 TSM GHOST RADIO
AN/PRC-167: L3Harris Multi-channel Manpack
AN/PRC-168: Radio set
AN/PRC-169(V): Silvus StreamCaster Radios
AN/PRC-170: Thales Javelin MANET (Mobile Ad-hoc Networking) Handheld Radio
AN/PRC-171: L3Harris Compact Team Radio
AN/PRC-343: IISR (Integrated Intra Squad Radio) – Marconi H4855
AN/PRQ-7
AN/PRR-9
AN/PRS-1: Upgrade of original SCR-625 mine detector
AN/PRS-2: Mamie mine detector/Geiger counter
AN/PRS-3: Mine detector
AN/PRS-4: Mine detector
AN/PRS-5: Mine detector
AN/PRS-6: Mine detector
AN/PRS-7: Mine detector, metallic and plastic
AN/PRS-8: Mine detector
AN/PRS-9: Anti-intrusion device
AN/PRT-4
AN/PSM-6: Analog Volt-Ohm-Meter (VOM)
AN/PSM-13: Battery tester for BA-4386
AN/PSN-4: LORAN Manpack Receiver for Army helicopters avionics, developed by Teledyne Systems, Inc., Northridge, California
AN/PSN-8: Manpack GPS receiver
AN/PSN-11: PLGR (Precision Lightweight GPS Receiver)
AN/PSN-13: DAGR (Defense Advanced GPS Receiver)
AN/PSG-2A: Digital Message Device
AN/PSS-1
AN/PSS-10
AN/PSS-11: mine detector
AN/PSS-12: mine detector
AN/PSS-13: mine detector
AN/PSS-14: mine detector
AN/PSQ-4: Raytheon manpack radio
AN/PSQ-5: Signal Analyzer System by TEKTRONIX
AN/PSQ-6(V): Manpack radio set
AN/PSQ-7: Monitor and Programmer assembly
AN/PSQ-8: Radio set by Raytheon, to be used with JTIDS & MIDS (Joint Tactical Information Distribution System and Multifunctional Information Distribution System)
AN/PSQ-9: TPCS-MPC (Team Portable Collection System Multi-Platform Capable), a man-portable computer system for gathering COMINT and SIGINT in the field
AN/PSQ-10: Penetrometer case
AN/PSQ-11(V): Topside Chlorinator/De-Chlorinator Ensemble, water treatment
AN/PSQ-13: Nightstalker II Night Vision Device, interfaces with camera to take photos with night vision capabilities
AN/PSQ-14: GLDNSM (Grenade Launcher Day/Night Sight Mounts)
AN/PSQ-16(V): HHM (Hand Held Monitor) radio receiver, part of L3 REMBASS II/BAIS (Remotely Monitored Battlefield Sensor System-II;  Battlefield Anti-Intrusion System), which uses acoustic sensors to warn of enemy intrusions
AN/PSQ-17: CPS (Communication Planning System), a notebook computer
AN/PSQ-18: Grenade launcher sight
AN/PSQ-19 and AN/PSQ-19A: TLDHS (Target Location, Designation, and Hand-Off System), a man-portable equipment suite allowing operators to determine their location and designate enemy locations for fires.
AN/PSQ-20: ENVG (Enhanced Night Vision Goggle), monocular fusion night vision system
AN/PSQ-21: Day/Night Imager (V)2, (IMAGER 2), hand-placed thermal imaging equipment used to detect enemy movements
AN/PSQ-22:  HHPM (Hand-Held Programmer-Monitor), a sensor emplacement tool used to program sensor units and collect remote sensor data
AN/PSQ-23: L3Harris STORM (Small Tactical Optical Rifle-Mounted laser rangefinder), includes laser rangefinder, ballistic calculator, as well visible and IR lasers
AN/PSQ-25: EPLRS-ENM (Enhanced Position Location Reporting System; EPLRS Network Manager), a software based in a ruggedized laptop for tracking troop movements
AN/PSQ-27: Master station case, associated with AN/PSQ-9 TPCS-MPC (Team Portable Collection System Multi-Platform Capable), used for gathering COMINT and SIGINT
AN/PSQ-28: Locate case (direction finder set?), associated with  AN/PSQ-9 TPCS-MPC (Team Portable Collection System Multi-Platform Capable), used for gathering COMINT and SIGINT
AN/PSQ-29: Modular case, associated with AN/PSQ-9 TPCS-MPC (Team Portable Collection System Multi-Platform Capable), used for gathering COMINT and SIGINT
AN/PSQ-30: Advanced case, associated with AN/PSQ-9 TPCS-MPC (Team Portable Collection System Multi-Platform Capable), used for gathering COMINT and SIGINT
AN/PSQ-34: Penetrometer for surveying work
AN/PSQ-35: Receiving radio set
AN/PSQ-36: L3 FGS/FGS-PI (Fusion Goggle System (Product-Improvement)), binocular fusion night vision system
AN/PSQ-37(V): Receiving radio set
AN/PSQ-38(V): Receiving radio set
AN/PSQ-39: L3 ENVG III program (Enhanced Night Vision Goggle), monocular fusion night vision system
AN/PSQ-40: DRS ENVG III program (Enhanced Night Vision Goggle), monocular fusion night vision system
AN/PSQ-42: L3Harris ENVG-B (Enhanced Night Vision Goggle-Binocular); pair of binocular fusion night vision goggles
AN/PSQ-44: Elbit ENVG-B (Enhanced Night Vision Goggle-Binocular); pair of binocular fusion night vision goggles
AN/PVN-1: landing light set (portable)
AN/PVQ-2: Sensory Aid Device, for helping individuals with vision impairments navigate their environments, device sent out pulses of light which, when reflected off of objects around the user, would give the user an auditory cue
AN/PVQ-31A and AN/PVQ-31B: Trijicon ACOG M150 RCO (Rifle Combat Optic), based on Trijicon TA31RCO ACOG; for mounting on M16A2/A4 (AN/PVQ-31A) or M4 Carbine (AN/PVQ-31B) 
AN/PVS-1: Night vision scope
AN/PVS-2: Starlight scope (night vision scope)
AN/PVS-3: Night Vision Sight, Miniaturized
AN/PVS-4: Night Vision Sight, Individual Served Weapon  (night vision sight for small arms)
AN/PVS-5: Night Vision Goggles
AN/PVS-6: Litton MELIOS (Mini Eyesafe Laser Infrared Observation Set), binocular system with laser target designator
AN/PVS-7: ITT/Litton Night Vision Goggles system, dual-eye single-tube design
AN/PVS-8: Long Range Night Vision Sight
AN/PVS-9(V): Simrad Night Weapon Sight
AN/PVS-10: Litton Night Vision Sniper Scope (8.5x), also referred to as Sniper Night Sight (SNS) in other sources, specifically the SNS2142
AN/PVS-11: Litton Pocketscope  (handheld monocular)
AN/PVS-12: L3 Aquila Sniper Night Sight, PVS-12 (WS2150) is 4x while PVS-12A (WS2154) is 6x scope 
AN/PVS-13: L3 LMNVS (Laser Marker Night Vision Sight), only to be used with AN/PEQ-1A laser designator
AN/PVS-14: MNVD (Monocular Night Vision Device), ITT and Litton versions
AN/PVS-15: L3 BNVS (Binocular Night Vision System), M953 and M921
AN/PVS-16: Gyro-Stabilized Binoculars
AN/PVS-17: L3 MNS (Miniature Night Sight), night vision weapon sight
AN/PVS-18: L3 M983 Night Vision Monocular, handheld or helmet mounted
AN/PVS-19: L3 INOD? (Integrated Night/Day Fire Control Observation Device)
AN/PVS-20: L3 night vision sight, for crew served weapons
AN/PVS-21: Steiner Low Profile NVG
AN/PVS-22: UNS (Universal Night Sight), a night weapon sight co-designed by OSTI Startron and KAC, likely most similar to the MilSight T105 currently produced by FLIR.
AN/PVS-23: Harris Night Vision Binocular (F5050), ruggedized night vision binoculars derived from the aviation AN/AVS-6/9
AN/PVS-24: L3Harris M2124 CNVD (Clip-on Night Vision Device); clip-on NV weapon sight, previously referred to as IWNS-I2 (Individual Weapon Night Sight Image Intensified)
AN/PVS-25: L3 WFoV DIT NVG (Wide Field of View; Diverging Image Tube; Night Vision Goggles), a prototype pair of night vision goggles optimized to increase peripheral vision
AN/PVS-26: KAC UNS LRLP (Universal Night Sight Long Range Low Profile), night vision scope
AN/PVS-27: FLIR MUNS (Magnum Universal Night Sight), based on MilSight S135, previously referred to as Scout Sniper Medium Range Night Sight (SSMRNS)
AN/PVS-29: SureFire VLIR (Visible Light Illuminator Replacement), flashlight based on the M962 kit. Fielded by USMC.
AN/PVS-30: KAC UNS LR LP (Universal Night Sight Long Range Low Profile). Has also been designated as UNS LR and CoSNS (Clip-on Sniper Night Sight) in the past.
AN/PVS-31: L3Harris BNVD(Binocular Night Vision Device)
MX-12391/PVS: SureFire VBL III M620V Vampire Scout Tan (Visible Bright Light), weapon-mounted light with dual visible/IR output
MX-12392/PVS: SureFire VBL III M720V Raid Black (Visible Bright Light), weapon-mounted light with dual visible/IR output
MX-12393/PVS: Insight VBL III WMX200 (detachable) weapon-mounted dual IR/visible light output (this variant can detach from weaponmount to be used hand-held)
MX-12393A/PVS: Insight VBL III WMX200 (fixed to rail) weapon-mounted dual IR/visible light output
MX-12393B/PVS: Insight VBL III WMX200 (swing mount variant) weapon-mounted dual IR/visible light output (this variant has a hinge on the mount which allows the flashlight to swing out; depending on which rail the light is mounted to, the hinge allows the light to swing upward or downward)
MX-12395/PVS: SureFire VBL III M720V Raid Tan (Visible Bright Light), weapon-mounted light with dual IR/visible output
SU-230/PVS: Elcan 1-4x Articulated Telescope (SpecterDR) in tan
SU-230A/PVS: Elcan SpecterDR 1-4x for 7.62mm weapons
SU-230B/PVS: Elcan SpecterDR 1.5-6x for 7.62mm weapons
SU-230C/PVS: Elcan SpecterDR 1.5-6x for 5.56mm weapons
SU-231/PEQ: EOTech 553, it replaced the previously used Trijicon reflex sight and ECOS-N (Aimpoint CompM2) from SOPMOD Block I
SU-231A/PEQ: Eotech XPS3 Black
SU-231B/PEQ: Eotech XPS3 variant for use with M2 Browning
SU-231C/PEQ: Eotech XPS3 Tan
SU-232/PAS: L3 CNVD-T (Clip-on Night Vision Device-Thermal) weapon sight
SU-233/PVS: Insight VBL III (Visible Bright Light), based on Insight M3X, with IR filter; is a replacement for the VBL II (which was based on the SureFire M952V kit but did not have a JETDS designation)
SU-237/PVS: Trijicon ACOG TA31ECOS
SU-238/PVS: Insight VBL III (Visible Bright Light), based on Insight M6 weapon light with laser and IR laser; is a replacement for the VBL II (which was based on the SureFire M952V kit but did not have a JETDS designation)
SU-250/U: Elbit image convertor for F6015VGA night vision monocular
SU-251/U: ITT image intensifier for AN/AVS-9 F4949 goggles
SU-252/U: NVS thermal sight (Night Vision Systems LLC), used as a thermal weapon sight on M2HB and M240 machine guns
SU-253/PEQ: EOTech M40GL grenade launcher sight
SU-255/U: FLIR/OSTI long range night sight
SU-258/PVQ: Trijicon SDO (Squad automatic weapon Day Optic), mounted on M249 SAW or M27 IAR; is made up of TA11 SDO 3.5x35 ACOG w/ Trijicon RMR (Ruggedized Miniature Reflex sight)
SU-260/P:  Trijicon MDO (Machine gun Day Optic), mounted on M240 machine gun; is made up of TA648MGO-240 6x48 ACOG w/ Trijicon RMR (Ruggedized Miniature Reflex sight)   
SU-261/P: L3/Insight MRDS (Mini Red Dot Sight)
SU-263/PVS: SureFire VBL-H (Visible Bright Light), a light mounted to crew-served weapons, based on the SureFire Hellfighter
SU-264/PEQ: EOTech ECOS-H (Enhanced Combat Optic System-Heavy), based on EOTech MK 56, designed to be mounted on the M2 machine gun as a quick reaction sight
SU-265/PEQ: Elcan ECOS-H (Enhanced Combat Optic System-Heavy), designed as a wide field of view optic to be mounted on the M2 machine gun
SU-267/P: DRS SPOTR thermal sight (Spot On Target), used by infantry to verify that the LA-10u/PEQ or LA-16u/PEQ HLM (Handheld Laser Marker) is correctly designating a target
SU-269/PVS: Elcan SpecterDR 1-4x for 5.56mm weapons in black (same as SU-230/PVS except for color)
SU-270/PAS: FLIR TaNS (Tactical Night Sight), I2 night vision scope
SU-271/PAS: FLIR ThermoSight T70 Weapon Sight and Recon Scope
SU-277/PSQ: L3 BSM (Ballistic Sighting Module), a reflex sight with IR aiming and illuminating lasers for aiming M203, M320, MK 19, and other standard low-medium velocity weapons systems
SU-278/PVS: Aimpoint Micro T-1, the red dot component of the ECOS-O (Enhanced Combat Optical Sight-Optimized)
SU-279/PVS: Leupold Mark 6 3-18x44mm, the scope component of ECOS-O (Enhanced Combat Optical Sight-Optimized)
SU-280/PAS: Leonardo DRS INOD-Block III (Improved Night/Day Observation Device) thermal weapon sight
SU-289/PVQ: Trijicon SCO VCOG 1-8x scope (Squad Combat Optic; Variable Combat Optic Gunsight)
SU-290/PEQ: L3Harris ESLRF (Eye-Safe Laser RangeFinder), part of the MTS (Multi-spectral Targeting System)
SU-291/PVS: Trijicon HRS (Handgun Reflex Sight), fulfills role of MAS-D HRS (Miniature Aiming System-Day Optic; Handgun Reflex Sight); sight is based on Trijicon RMR (Ruggedized Mini Reflex)
SU-292/PVS: Eotech CQS (Close Quarters Sight), fulfills role of CQS in the MAS-D program (Miniature Aiming System-Day Optic; Close Quarters Sight), the exact model is not specified as of July 2022   
SU-293/PVS: SIG Tango6 1-6x24mm scope, fulfills role of MAS-D S-VPS (Miniature Aiming System-Day Optic;  Squad Variable Power Scope) for SOCOM, DVO (Direct View Optic) for Army M4A1 carbines, and is the optic used with M110A1 Rifle
SU-294/PVS: Nightforce 1-8x24mm scope MAS-D S-VPS (Miniature Aiming System-Day Optic;  Squad Variable Power Scope), based on Nightforce ATACR 1-8x24mm F1 optic, is used with the M4A1
SU-295/PVS: Nightforce 5-25x56mm scope MAS-D P-VPS Standard (Miniature Aiming System-Day Optic;  Precision Variable Power Scope, Standard), is based on ATACR 5-25x56mm F1 scope (Advanced Tactical Riflescope, Front Focal Plane), is used with MK 21 PSR, M107 AMR, and MK 22 ASR.
SU-296/PVS: Nightforce 7-35x56mm scope MAS-D P-VPS Long Range (Miniature Aiming System-Day Optic;  Precision Variable Power Scope, Long Range), based on ATACR 7-35x56mm F1 scope (Advanced Tactical Riflescope, Front Focal Plane), for use with MK 21 PSR, M107 AMR, and MK 22 ASR.
SU-298/PVS: Matbock ARD (Acquire-Read-Deploy) launcher sight, for use with MK 19, M203, M320, Carl Gustaf 8.4 cm recoilless rifle
SU-300/PVS: Vortex 1-6x24mm scope MAS-D S-VPS (Miniature Aiming System-Day Optic;  Squad Variable Power Scope), is based on Vortex Razor HD Gen II-E 1-6x24mm 
SU-303/PVS: Nightforce 4-20x50mm scope MAS-D R-VPS (Miniature Aiming System-Day Optic; Ranging-Variable Power Scope), based on Nightforce ATACR 4-20x50mm F1, and used MK 17, MK 20 SSR, M110A1 (SDMR vs CSASS?), M110A3
AN/PYQ-7
AN/PYQ-10

S

 AN/SAR-1: U.S. Navy, Viewer, Infrared (handheld or searchlight mounted).  Model MI-2558, MI-2558a; Mfg by RCA (previously US/C-3 and US/C-3a)
 AN/SAR-2: U.S. Navy Infrared Receiving Set (handheld). Viewer mfg by RCA.
 AN/SAR-4: U.S. Navy Viewing Set, Infrared (searchlight mounted). Mfg by Lewyt Mfg Corp.
 AN/SAR-6: U.S. Navy Viewing Set, Infrared (handheld or searchlight mounted). Mfg by Lewyt Mfg Corp.
 AN/SAR-7: U.S. Navy Viewing Set, Infrared (handheld or searchlight mounted). Mfg by VARO Inc and B&B Mfg Co.
 AN/SAR-7A: U.S. Navy Viewing Set, Infrared (handheld or searchlight mounted). Mfg by VARO Inc
AN/SLA-15: Naval Electronic Warfare Countermeasures Antenna Set
AN/SLQ-17: deception repeater for s
AN/SLQ-25: Naval Torpedo Decoy System "Nixie"
AN/SLQ-26: Naval Electronic Warfare Countermeasures Suite
AN/SLQ-32: Naval Electronic Warfare Suite
AN/SLQ-49: Chaff Buoy Decoy System
AN/SPA-4:  Shipboard Radar Repeater (tube model)
AN/SPA-25: Shipboard Radar Repeater (transistorized)
AN/SPA-66: Radar Indicator, Hazeltine Corp., Dero R&D Corp., Gulf Aerospace
AN/SPA-256: Display used with AN/SPS-55 Radar, Cardion Electronics, Inc.
AN/SPG-49: Illumination and tracking radar associated with RIM-8 Talos fire control system.
AN/SPG-51: sea missile fire control radar mounted on s, Virginia-class cruisers, s, and s.
AN/SPG-53: Naval Gunfire Control Radar Director mounted on s, s, s, s, Charles F. Adams-class destroyers, s as well as others.
AN/SPG-55: sea missile fire control radar mounted on Belknap-class cruisers, s and Farragut-class destroyers.
AN/SPG-59: multifunction radar for Typhon combat system; canceled 1963
AN/SPG-60: sea missile fire control radar mounted on Charles F. Adams-class destroyers
AN/SPG-62: sea fire control radar
AN/SPN-10: shipboard automatic landing system, Bell Aircraft Corp. under BuShips contract
AN/SPN-35: automatic landing system radar
AN/SPN-41
AN/SPN-42: automatic carrier landing system radar
AN/SPN-43: air marshalling radar
AN/SPN-44: air traffic control radar
AN/SPN-45
AN/SPN-46
AN/SPQ-5: early beam emitting radar for early model Terrier missiles
AN/SPQ-9: sea fire control radar
AN/SPQ-10
AN/SPQ-11: sea space tracking radar, Cobra Judy
AN/SPS-6: 2D air search radar
AN/SPS-8: 2D height finding radar
AN/SPS-10: 2D surface search radar
AN/SPS-12: 2D air search radar
AN/SPS-29: sea radar
AN/SPS-30: 3D air search radar
AN/SPS-32: sea radar mounted on s and the 
AN/SPS-33: sea radar mounted on Long Beach-class cruisers and the Enterprise-class aircraft carrier
AN/SPS-37: 2D air search radar
AN/SPS-39: 3D air search radar
AN/SPS-40: 2D air search radar
AN/SPS-43: 2D air search radar
AN/SPS-48: 3D sea air search radar
AN/SPS-49: sea air search radar
AN/SPS-52: sea radar
AN/SPS-55: surface search radar
AN/SPS-58: Low altitude 2D air search radar
AN/SPS-64: navigation radar, USN designation for Canadian LN-66 radar.
AN/SPS-67: surface search radar
AN/SPS-73: surface search radar
AN/SPS-77:
AN/SPW-2: RIM-8 Talos guidance radar
AN/SPY-1: sea radar mounted on s and s
AN/SPY-2
AN/SPY-3: sea radar to be mounted on the DD(X) and CG(X) classes
AN/SPY-6
AN/SPY-7
AN/SQQ-23: sea sonar
AN/SQQ-32
AN/SQQ-34: carrier ASW suite
AN/SQQ-89
AN/SQR-17: sonobuoy processor part of the LAMPS system used on Knox, -class ships
AN/SQR-18: tactical towed array sonar system used on Knox-class ships
AN/SQR-19: tactical towed array sonar system as part of the AN/SQQ-89 suite
AN/SQR-20: Passive-Only Towed Array Sonar System (TASS) (now known as the TB-37U)
AN/SQS-23: transducer (naval aircraft) Massa Division of Dynamics Corp. of America, Hazeltine Corporation
AN/SQS-26: sea sonar
AN/SQS-35: variable depth sonar system (IVDS).
AN/SQS-38: hull-mounted version of the AN/SQS-35 designed for  Coast Guard cutters—removed in the 1990s
AN/SQS-53: sea sonar
AN/SQS-56: hull mounted sonar system designed for the Oliver Hazard Perry-class frigates nicknamed "Hellen Keller"
AN/SRC-9: radio navigation set for Virginia-class cruisers
AN/SRC-31: receiver for Virginia-class cruisers
AN/SSQ-1: Magnavox prototype sonobuoy (obsolete)
AN/SSQ-15: first production active sonobuoy, range-only B-size sonobuoy (obsolete – replaced in the late 1960s by the lighter A-size AN/SSQ-47)
AN/SSQ-2B: first mass-produced sonobuoy (obsolete)
AN/SSQ-20: an Americanized version of the British T-1946 directional sonobuoy (obsolete)
AN/SSQ-23: omnidirectional 'Julie' first low frequency passive sonobuoy (obsolete)
AN/SSQ-28: omnidirectional 'Jezebel' Low Frequency Analysis and Recording (LOFAR) passive sonobuoy (obsolete)
AN/SSQ-36: BathyThermograph (BT) sonobuoy
AN/SSQ-41: Low Frequency Analysis and Recording (LOFAR) passive sonobuoy (obsolete – replaced both AN/SSQ-23 and AN/SSQ-28)
AN/SSQ-42: Extended Echo Ranging (EER) directional sonobuoy, Hazeltine
AN/SSQ-46: EER directional sonobuoy, General Electric
AN/SSQ-47: range only active sonobuoy (obsolete)
AN/SSQ-48: omnidirectional 'Jezebel' LOFAR passive sonobuoy (obsolete)
AN/SSQ-50: Command Activated Sonobuoy System (CASS) sonobuoy (obsolete – was introduced to replace AN/SSQ-47)
AN/SSQ-53: Directional Frequency Analysis and Recording (DIFAR) passive directional sonobuoy
AN/SSQ-57: Low Frequency Analysis and Recording (LOFAR) sonobuoy (obsolete – was merged with DIFAR AN/SSQ-53)
AN/SSQ-62: Directional Command Activated Sonobuoy System (DICASS) active sonobuoy, developed and manufactured under the auspices of Naval Air Development Center, Warminster, PA, by Sparton Corp., Jackson, MI, and Raytheon, Newport, RI
AN/SSQ-75: Expendable Reliable Acoustic Path Sonobuoy (ERAPS) active sonobuoy (obsolete)
AN/SSQ-77: Vertical Line Array Directional (VLAD) frequency analysis and recording sonobuoy
AN/SSQ-86: Data Link Communications (DLC) sonobuoy
AN/SSQ-101: Air Deployable Active Receiver (ADAR) sonobuoy
AN/SSQ-110: Extended Echo Ranging (EER) sonobuoy
AN/SSQ-108: OUTBOARD and OUTBOARD II
AN/SSQ-125: active sonobuoy
AN/SSQ-536: BathyThermograph (BT) sonobuoy, Ultra Electronics
AN/SSQ-553: directional passive sonobuoy, Ultra Electronics
AN/SSQ-565: multistatic low frequency active source sonobuoy, Ultra Electronics
AN/SSQ-573: directional low frequency active receiver sonobuoy, Ultra Electronics
AN/SSQ-906: Low Frequency Analysis and Recording (LOFAR) omnidirectional sonobuoy, Ultra Electronics
AN/SSQ-926: active transmitter sonobuoy, Ultra Electronics
AN/SSQ-955: directional passive sonobuoy, Ultra Electronics
AN/SSQ-963: Command Active Multi-Beam Sonobuoy (CAMBS) directional sonobuoy, Ultra Electronics
AN/SYS-1: Automatic Detection & Tracking System developed under the auspices of Naval Sea Systems Command by Applied Physics Laboratory, Howard County, MD, and manufactured by Hughes Aircraft Co., Fullerton, CA, Dynell Electronics Corp., NY, Univac, Electronic Communications Inc., FL
AN/SYS-2: sea mission computer
AN/SYA-1: tactical display system
AN/SYA-4: tactical display system

T
AN/TAS-1
AN/TAS-2 IR sight for 106mm recoilless rifle
AN/TAS-3
AN/TAS-4 A thermal imaging night sight developed by Texas Instruments for the U.S. Army
AN/TGC-14A: lightweight teletypewriter set, developed as a commercial teleprinter (MITE Mod 104) by the Mite Corp. (not to be confused with Mitre Corp.), a small business
AN/TLQ-17: communications and countermeasures system
AN/TMQ-19: meteorological radar for use in AN/UMQ-7 system, Servo Corporation of America
AN/TMQ-22: portable weather observing pack which measures ambient pressure, temperature, dew point, surface wind, and precipitation, Cambridge Systems, Inc.
AN/TMQ-53: transportable meteorological observing system (TMOS)
AN/TPL-1: searchlight radar
AN/TPN-1: radar beacon big Eureka Rebecca/Eureka transponding radar
AN/TPN-2 Rebecca/Eureka transponding radar
AN/TPN-3
AN/TPN-4
AN/TPQ-10
AN/TPQ-31: radar
AN/TPQ-36
AN/TPQ-37
AN/TPQ-43: Seek Score
AN/TPQ-48 Lightweight Counter Mortar Radar
AN/TPQ-49 Lightweight Counter Mortar Radar (v2)
AN/TPS-1:  transportable Air Surveillance Radar
AN/TPS-1D: transportable Air Surveillance Radar
AN/TPS-1E: transportable Air Surveillance Radar
AN/TPS-1G: transportable Air Surveillance Radar
AN/TPS-2
AN/TPS-3
AN/TPS-4
AN/TPS-5
AN/TPS-6
AN/TPS-7
AN/TPS-8
AN/TPS-9
AN/TPS-10
AN/TPS-11
AN/TPS-12
AN/TPS-13
AN/TPS-14
AN/TPS-15
AN/TPS-16
AN/TPS-17
AN/TPS-18
AN/TPS-19
AN/TPS-20
AN/TPS-22 Search and acquisition radar. Antenna reflector was on inside of rotating inflatable radome. USMC
AN/TPS-25 Ground Surveillance Radar
AN/TPS-32 lightweight amphibious assault radar
AN/TPS-34 Search and acquisition radar. Had incoherent MTI. Used by USMC and RAF
AN/TPS-41: mobile weather radar that can detect, locate, and determine size, shape, intensity, and movement of precipitation, natural clouds and nuclear clouds out to a range of 160 n.m.
AN/TPS-42 Mobile air surveillance radar, man-pack, low frequency, UHF-band, 3-D radar, solid state except for power transmitter tubes and cathode-ray tubes display, 50 mi coverage, developed by RADC, antennas by Goodyear/Loral
AN/TPS-43
AN/TPS-44 Air surveillance radar
AN/TPS-58 Ground Surveillance Radar
AN/TPS-59: transportable air surveillance and theater ballistic missile (TBM) detection radar
AN/TPS-63: Mobile 2D surveillance radar
AN/TPS-68: Tactical Weather Radar
AN/TPS-70
AN/TPS-71: ROTHR (Relocatable Over-the-Horizon Radar)
AN/TPS-72
AN/TPS-75: transportable 3-dimensional air search radar
AN/TPS-77: transportable version of the AN/FPS-117 solid state phased array radar
AN/TPS-78
AN/TPX-46: Interrogator Set, ground portion of the DOD AIMS Mark XII IFF System used with MIM-23 Hawk, MIM-14 Nike Hercules, and Army Air Defense Control and Coordination Systems, it is also used in conjunction with Ground Control Approach Radar. Manufactured by Hazeltine Corp., Little Neck, N.Y.
AN/TPY-2 THAAD
AN/TRA-1: signal booster for AN/TRC-1, -3, and -4
AN/TRC-1: radio relay station
AN/TRC-2 SCR-694
AN/TRC-3: radio relay station
AN/TRC-4: radio relay station
AN/TRC-25: radio
AN/TRC-75
AN/TRC-77: radio
AN/TRC-80
AN/TRC-97
AN/TRD-4: direction finder
AN/TRN-30: low frequency beacon, LORAN
AN/TRQ-23: receiving set
AN/TRQ-30: man pack assembly
AN/TRW-1: target control transmitting equipment
AN/TSC-88: mobile satellite communications
AN/TSM-1: crystal tester TS-39 Standard Oscillator
AN/TSM-2 
AN/TSM-3: crystal tester TS-330 Standard Oscillator
AN/TSM-4: crystal tester TS-384 Standard Oscillator
AN/TSM-5
AN/TSM-6: test set for type AN/SSQ-2 Sonobuoys
AN/TSM-7
AN/TSM-8
AN/TSM-9
AN/TSM-10
AN/TSM-126
AN/TSM-136: automated spectral analysis system (under development in 1978, never completed/fielded)
AN/TSQ-8: Coordinate Data Set
AN/TSQ-51: "Missile Mentor" Nike missile CCCS computer
AN/TSC-62: Technical Control Facility
AN/TSQ-73: Army Tactical Air Control System/Tactical Air Defense System "Missile Minder"
AN/TSQ-81 COMBAT SKYSPOT ground directed bombing unit, transportable version of AN/MSQ-77.
AN/TSQ-91: Air Force Tactical Air Control System/Tactical Air Defense System
AN/TSQ-178: Joint-STARS ground station
AN/TSQ-179: Joint-STARS Common Ground Station (CGS)
AN/TSQ-198: Tactical Terminal Control System
AN/TSW-7: Air Force Tower LORAN Manual Air Terminal
AN/TTC: transportable telephone switchboards
AN/TVQ-2 Ground/Vehicular Laser Locator Designator (G/VLLD)
AN/TVS-5
AN/TYC-10: Message Processing Center (MPC); Air Force Tactical Air Control System/Tactical Air Defense System
AN/TYQ-1: Tactical Air Command Central (TACC), a cornerstone of the Marine Air Command and Control System (MACCS), Philco-Ford
AN/TYQ-2: Tactical Air Operations Central (TAOC), MACCS, Litton
AN/TYQ-3: Tactical Data Communications Central (TDCC), MACCS, Collins Radio and Univac
AN/TYQ-23 Transportable Automated Air Command and Control System

U
AN/UCC-4
AN/UDM-1: Army Radiac Calibrator Set
AN/UDM-2: Army Radiac Calibrator Set
AN/UDM-6: Army Radiac Calibrator Set
AN/UDM-7: Army Radiac Calibrator Set
AN/UGC-16: teletype, Teletype Corp.
AN/UGC-20: teletype, Stelma Co.
AN/UGC-49: Teletypewriter
AN/ULQ-6
AN/UMQ-7: Army Meteorological Data Sounding System with airborne elements installed on a fast-rise balloon, which includes radar (AN/TMQ-19), balloons and radiosondes which measures temperature, humidity, wind speed and direction, and atmospheric pressure up to an altitude of 30 km. This data is used for artillery ballistic corrections. Engelhard Industries, Inc.
AN/UPN-1: radar beacon BUPS (Beacon Ultra Portable S-Band)
AN/UPN-2: radar beacon BUPS
AN/UPN-3: radar beacon BUPSX was AN/PPN-6
AN/UPN-4: radar beacon BUPSX was AN/PPN-7
AN/UPS-1: limited range "gap-filler" search radar; designed to fit in a single landing craft; USMC and RAF
AN/UPX-37
AN/UPX-137: IFF system test set
AN/UPX-39: Interrogator System
AN/UQQ-2
AN/URC-4: Emergency bail out radio, transmitted beacon or voice on 121.5 or 243 MHz
AN/URC-10
AN/URC-11
AN/URC-14
AN/URC-32 Shipboard HF Transceiver
AN/URC-64
AN/URC-68
AN/URD-4: navigation direction finder for use with Virginia-class cruisers
AN/URM-25D Signal Generator
AN/URN-20: TACAN navigation system for Virginia-class cruisers
AN/URN-25: Beacon, together with the OE-273(V) antenna, transmits and receives coded radio signals to and from TACAN equipped aircraft so that aircraft can determine identity of vessel and aircraft distance and bearing from beacon. Gould NavCom Systems (AN/URN-25); ITT Avionics (OE-273)
AN/URQ-9 Frequency Standard
AN/URQ-10 Frequency Standard
AN/URQ-13 Frequency Standard radio for Virginia-class cruisers
AN/USR-1: Airborne Surveillance Receiver Watkins-Johnson  
AN/UPR-2: ionospheric sounder for Virginia-class cruisers
AN/USC-42 Miniaturized Demand-Assigned Multiple Access (Mini-DAMA) SATCOM transceiver
AN/USC-61 Digital Modular Radio
AN/USD-1 Drone
AN/USD-2
AN/USM-247: Versatile Avionics Shop Test (VAST) System, a computer-controlled integrated system of testing modules and response monitors for aircraft carriers and shore-based installations to test avionics subsystems in the F-14A, E-2C and S-3A weapons systems, PRD Electronics (prime)
AN/USQ-17: sea-based computer
AN/USQ-20: sea-based computer
AN/USQ-144: Automated Digital Network System (ADNS)
AN/USQ-124: Tactical Intelligence (TACINTEL)
AN/USQ-148: SCI Networks
AN/USQ-208: Consolidated Afloat Networks and Enterprise Services (CANES)
AN/UYA-1: tactical display system
AN/UYA-4: tactical display system
AN/UYK-1: submarine-based computer for TRANSIT (NAVSAT) location system
AN/UYK-3: sea-based computer
AN/UYK-7: sea-based computer
AN/UYK-8: sea-based computer
AN/UYK-19: naval electronic warfare computer
AN/UYK-20: sea-based computer
AN/UYK-43: sea-based computer
AN/UYK-44: sea-based computer
AN/UYQ-21: tactical display system
AN/UYQ-70: combat direction system
AN/UYS-1: acoustic sonobuoy processor
AN/UYS-2: acoustic sonobuoy processor; possibly improved

V
AN/VDR-1: Army Vehicular Radiac Meter, Nuclear Corporation of America
AN/VIR-31A: Receiver for H-3 and S-3 aircraft, manufactured by Rockwell International-Collins Defense Communications Group (to be used in AN/ARN-126 system)
AN/VPS-2
AN/VRC-1
AN/VRC-2
AN/VRC-3 SCR-300 with power pack.
AN/VRC-4
AN/VRC-5
AN/VRC-6
AN/VRC-7 general use
AN/VRC-8 Armor
AN/VRC-9 Artillery
AN/VRC-10 Infantry
AN/VRC-11
AN/VRC-12 1st Universal use radio
AN/VRC-13
AN/VRC-14
AN/VRC-15
AN/VRC-16
AN/VRC-44
AN/VRC-87 SINCGARS
AN/VRC-88
AN/VRC-89
AN/VRC-90
AN/VRC-91
AN/VRC-92F SINCGARS
AN/VRC-100
AN/VRC-101
AN/VRC-102
AN/VRC-103
AN/VRC-104
AN/VRC-105
AN/VRC-106
AN/VRC-107
AN/VRC-108
AN/VRC-109
AN/VRC-110
AN/VRC-111
AN/VRW-1: target control receiving equipment
AN/VSS-1: searchlight, Xenon, 2.2KW, tank, jeep, or tower-mounted, provides a visible or infrared (IR) illumination source for troops equipped with M60 series or M48A2 tanks, modified ¼-ton trucks (jeeps), or stationary towers. It provides perimeter defense and battlefield lighting (visible mode), extends the range of infrared (IR) viewing devices, and provides a capability to track and fire on targets (visible or IR). Electro Space Corp., New York, NY, and VARO, Inc. Garland, Tex.

W

An/WLQ-4 Submarine Electronic Support Measures system
AN/WLR-1: Shipboard spectrum scan and analysis receiver, designed to be utilized on surface ships ans submarines. Remote tuners for each band servo tuned using  klystron local oscillators. Used TWT preamps later replaced by FETs. 
AN/WLR-6:
AN/WLR-8: Shipboard spectrum scan and analysis receiver, designed to be utilized in surface ships and submarines. Part of the Ships Advanced Electronic Warfare (SAEW) package
AN/WLR-9
AN/WLR-11
AN/WQX-2
AN/WRT-1 Shipboard HF Transmitter
AN/WRT-2 Shipboard HF Transmitter
AN/WSC-1 UHF SATCOM shipboard terminal, Collins Radio Co.
AN/WSC-3 UHF SATCOM shipboard terminal
AN/WSN-7 Ring Laser Gyro Navigation System WR Systems

Z
AN/ZPY-1: STARLite Radar
AN/ZPY-2: MP-RTIP Radar.
AN/ZSQ-2: Raytheon Common Sensor Payload used on USSOCOM helicopters

See also
Joint Electronics Type Designation System
List of World War II electronic warfare equipment
Signal Corps Radio
List of U.S. Signal Corps Vehicles (V-list)

Notes

References

External links
MobileRadar.org - radar descriptions
TPUB.com - radar manual, 1965
Directory of Communications-Electronic Equipment, JANAP 161, March 1953
AN/MSQ-77 Installation 
Designations Of U.S. Military Electronic And Communications Equipment

Military electronics of the United States
Electronics